Fulgeriș River may refer to:

 Fulgeriș, a tributary of the Bâsca in Buzău County, Romania
 Fulgeriș River (Siret), Romania